Thomas Bartwell Doe, Jr. (October 12, 1912 – July 19, 1969) was an American bobsledder who competed in the late 1920s. He won a silver medal in the five-man bobsleigh event at the 1928 Winter Olympics in St. Moritz. He died in Charlotte, North Carolina.

References
Bobsleigh five-man Olympic medalists for 1928
DatabaseOlympics.com profile

1912 births
1969 deaths
American male bobsledders
Bobsledders at the 1928 Winter Olympics
Olympic silver medalists for the United States in bobsleigh
People from Hendersonville, North Carolina
Medalists at the 1928 Winter Olympics